The Chandler House, at 167 S. Main St. in Walton, Kentucky, was built in the 1920s.  It was listed on the National Register of Historic Places in 1989.  The listing included two contributing buildings.

It was deemed significant "as a good example of the Craftsman/Bungalow style, significant to Boone County in the period 1905-1930."

References

National Register of Historic Places in Boone County, Kentucky
Houses completed in 1920
American Craftsman architecture in Kentucky
Bungalow architecture in Kentucky
1920 establishments in Kentucky
Houses in Boone County, Kentucky